Toi Suzuki (鈴木 透生, born 20 October 1999) is a Japanese water polo player. He competed in the 2020 Summer Olympics.

References

1999 births
Living people
Sportspeople from Yokohama
Water polo players at the 2020 Summer Olympics
Japanese male water polo players
Olympic water polo players of Japan
21st-century Japanese people